Sink or Swim is the debut studio album by the Gaslight Anthem, released May 29, 2007, through XOXO Records.

Reception
Despite little attention from major critics, the album met with strong reception from independent critics.  Absolutepunk.net received the album  very positively, citing frontman Brian Fallon for having a "talent for creating lyrics and melodies that are simple and catchy, yet never forced or unintelligent." The review also called "I'da Called You Woody, Joe" (a tribute to Joe Strummer) the highlight of the records, and noted the similarities between the opening track "Boomboxes and Dictionaries" and Against Me!'s “Sink. Florida. Sink.”  Punknews.org also praised the album and made many similar observations.  They called the record "the type of record that most young bands wish they could create to launch their musical career." Unplugged reviews noted that "The Gaslight Anthem blend anthemic punk-rock spirit with Springsteen-influenced storytelling (together with a folk influence that recalls early Against Me!) to create a compelling, addictive whole."  They also expressed appreciation for Fallon's "gruff vocals" and the contrast between up-tempo rockers like "We Came to Dance" and "Red in the Morning" and acoustic folk numbers like "The Navesink Banks" and "Red at Night."

Release
In December 2010, the album was re-released in Europe exclusively on vinyl.  This special release was limited to only 500 copies and featured a fold-out lyrics sheet.

Track listing

Personnel
Band
 Brian Fallon – lead vocals, guitar, harmonica, piano, producer
 Alex Rosamilia – guitar, backing vocals, producer
 Alex Levine – bass guitar, backing vocals, producer
 Benny Horowitz – drums, backing vocals, producer

Production
 Josh Jakubowski – recording engineer, producer
 Jason Livermore – audio mastering
 John Clemmons – photographs
 C. Spliedt – cover painting
 Ed Hanks – layout

References

The Gaslight Anthem albums
2007 debut albums